This is a list of notable events in country music that took place in the year 1985.

Events
 January — In radio, the United Stations Programming Network’s "Solid Gold Country," a country music spinoff of the oldies-focused "Solid Gold Scrapbook," switches from a three-hour-a-week show to a five-day-a-week program (with the option to air all five hours in as a weekly program). Under the new format, each hourly program covered a different topic, such as a profile on a singer, songwriter or producer; a look back at the popular songs from the current week in a past year, gold records from the current month and other topics under virtually every conceivable topic. The new program will run 8-1/2 years.
 May 8 - 20th Academy of Country Music Awards: Alabama, George Strait, and Reba McEntire win
 A story published in The New York Times declares that country music is "dead." However, a number of new acts – Randy Travis and Dwight Yoakam among them – are working behind the scenes to change the trend.
 The Country Music Association Awards introduced a new award, Music Video of the Year. The first recipient was Hank Williams Jr.'s video for  "All My Rowdy Friends Are Coming Over Tonight."

Top hits of the year

Singles released by American artists

Singles released by Canadian artists

Top new album releases

{| class="wikitable sortable"
|-
! US
! Album
! Artist
! Record Label
|-
| style="text-align:center;"| 1
| 40-Hour Week
| Alabama
| RCA
|-
| style="text-align:center;"| 8
| Alabama Christmas
| Alabama
| RCA
|-
| style="text-align:center;"| 25
| Amber Waves of Grain
| Merle Haggard
| Epic
|-
| style="text-align:center;"| 1
| Anything Goes
| Gary Morris
| Warner Bros.
|-
| style="text-align:center;"| 8
| The Ballad of Sally Rose
| Emmylou Harris
| Warner Bros.
|-
| style="text-align:center;"| 7
| Centerfield
| John Fogerty
| Warner Bros.
|-
| style="text-align:center;"| 22
| Darlin', Darlin| David Allan Coe
| Columbia
|-
| style="text-align:center;"| 7
| Don't Call Him a Cowboy
| Conway Twitty
| Warner Bros.
|-
| style="text-align:center;"| 24
| Favorite Country Hits
| Ricky Skaggs
| Epic
|-
| style="text-align:center;"| 1
| Five-O
| Hank Williams Jr.
| Curb/Warner Bros.
|-
| style="text-align:center;"| 4
| The Forester Sisters
| The Forester Sisters
| Warner Bros.
|-
| style="text-align:center;"| 4
| Greatest Hits
| George Strait
| MCA
|-
| style="text-align:center;"| 25
| Get to the Heart
| Barbara Mandrell
| MCA
|-
| style="text-align:center;"| 1
| Greatest Hits
| Earl Thomas Conley
| RCA
|-
| style="text-align:center;"| 4
| Greatest Hits
| Lee Greenwood
| MCA
|-
| style="text-align:center;"| 1
| Greatest Hits Vol. 2
| Ronnie Milsap
| RCA
|-
| style="text-align:center;"| 10
| Half Nelson
| Willie Nelson
| Columbia
|-
| style="text-align:center;"| 1
| Greatest Hits Volume 2
| Hank Williams Jr.
| Curb/Warner Bros.
|-
| style="text-align:center;"| 2
| Hang On to Your Heart
| Exile
| Epic
|-
| style="text-align:center;"| 1
| The Heart of the Matter
| Kenny Rogers
| RCA
|-
| style="text-align:center;"| 23
| High Country Snows
| Dan Fogelberg
| Full Moon/Epic
|-
| style="text-align:center;"| 1
| Highwayman
| The Highwaymen
| Columbia
|-
| style="text-align:center;"| 10
| Howard & David
| The Bellamy Brothers
| Curb/MCA
|-
| style="text-align:center;"| 1
| I Have Returned
| Ray Stevens
| MCA
|-
| style="text-align:center;"| 8
| Kern River
| Merle Haggard
| Epic
|-
| style="text-align:center;"| 7
| Last Mango in Paris
| Jimmy Buffett
| MCA
|-
| style="text-align:center;"| 4
| Let It Roll
| Mel McDaniel
| Capitol
|-
| style="text-align:center;"| 22
| Life Highway
| Steve Wariner
| MCA
|-
| style="text-align:center;"| 1
| Live in London
| Ricky Skaggs
| Epic
|-
| style="text-align:center;"| 1
| Lost in the Fifties Tonight
| Ronnie Milsap
| RCA
|-
| style="text-align:center;"| 17
| Love Is What We Make It
| Kenny Rogers
| Liberty
|-
| style="text-align:center;"| 3
| Me and Paul
| Willie Nelson
| Columbia
|-
| style="text-align:center;"| 1
| A Memory Like You
| John Schneider
| MCA
|-
| style="text-align:center;"| 13
| My Toot Toot
| Rockin' Sidney
| Epic
|-
| style="text-align:center;"| 17
| Nobody Wants to Be Alone
| Crystal Gayle
| Warner Bros.
|-
| style="text-align:center;"| 12
| Old Flame
| Juice Newton
| RCA
|-
| style="text-align:center;"| 24
| Old Ways
| Neil Young
| Geffen
|-
| style="text-align:center;"| 20
| One Good Night Deserves Another
| Steve Wariner
| MCA
|-
| style="text-align:center;"| 19
| One Step Closer
| Sylvia
| RCA
|-
| style="text-align:center;"| 1
| Pardners in Rhyme
| The Statler Brothers
| Mercury/PolyGram
|-
| style="text-align:center;"| 9
| Partners, Brothers and Friends
| Nitty Gritty Dirt Band
| Warner Bros.
|-
| style="text-align:center;"| 15
| Radio Heart
| Charly McClain
| Epic
|-
| style="text-align:center;"| 9
| Real Love
| Dolly Parton
| RCA
|-
| style="text-align:center;"| 10
| Restless Heart
| Restless Heart
| RCA
|-
| style="text-align:center;"| 1
| Rhythm & Romance
| Rosanne Cash
| Columbia
|-
| style="text-align:center;"| 1
| Rockin' with the Rhythm
| The Judds
| Curb/RCA
|-
| style="text-align:center;"| 2
| Sawyer Brown
| Sawyer Brown
| Capitol/Curb
|-
| style="text-align:center;"| 3
| Shakin'
| Sawyer Brown
| Capitol/Curb
|-
| style="text-align:center;"| 21
| Somebody Else's Fire
| Janie Fricke
| Columbia
|-
| style="text-align:center;"| 1
| Something Special
| George Strait
| MCA
|-
| style="text-align:center;"| 25
| Southern Pacific
| Southern Pacific
| Warner Bros.
|-
| style="text-align:center;"| 25
| Stand Up
| Mel McDaniel
| Capitol
|-
| style="text-align:center;"| 3
| Step On Out
| The Oak Ridge Boys
| MCA
|-
| style="text-align:center;"| 1
| Streamline
| Lee Greenwood
| MCA
|-
| style="text-align:center;"| 6
| Sweet Dreams–The Life andTimes of Patsy Cline (Soundtrack)
| Patsy Cline
| MCA
|-
| style="text-align:center;"| 16
| There's No Stopping Your Heart
| Marie Osmond
| Capitol/Curb
|-
| style="text-align:center;"| 24
| Tokyo, Oklahoma
| John Anderson
| Warner Bros.
|-
| style="text-align:center;"| 15
| Tryin' to Outrun the Wind
| John Schneider
| MCA
|-
| style="text-align:center;"| 23
| Turn the Page
| Waylon Jennings
| RCA
|-
| style="text-align:center;"| 6
| Who's Gonna Fill Their Shoes?
| George Jones
| Epic
|-
| style="text-align:center;"| 1
| Won't Be Blue Anymore
| Dan Seals
| Capitol
|}

Other top albums

On television

Regular series
 Hee Haw (1969–1993, syndicated)
 That Nashville Music (1970–1985, syndicated)

Specials

Births
 January 20 – Brantley Gilbert, singer of the 2010s best known for "Country Must Be Country Wide" and "You Don't Know Her Like I Do"
 May 20 – Jon Pardi, country singer of the 2010s
 June 12 – Chris Young, winner on the fourth season of Nashville Star
 August 26 – Brian Kelley, member of Florida Georgia Line, a duo of the 2010s.
 September 1 — Charlie Worsham, singer/multi-instrumentalist honored by the Mississippi state senate
 September 19 — Chase Rice, country singer of the 2010s

Deaths
 July 17 – Wynn Stewart, 51, key progenitor of the Bakersfield sound, known for hits such as "It's Such a Pretty World Today" (heart attack)
 August 8 – Benny Barnes, 51, former rhythm guitarist for George Jones, best known for his 1956 hit "Poor Man's Riches"
 October 11 -- Tex Williams, 68, Western swing and talking blues performer best known for "Smoke! Smoke! Smoke! (That Cigarette)" (pancreatic cancer)

Hall of Fame inductees

Country Music Hall of Fame inductees
Flatt and Scruggs (Lester Flatt 1914–1979 and Earl Scruggs 1924–2012)

Canadian Country Music Hall of Fame inductees
Don Messer
Hank Snow

Major awards

Grammy AwardsBest Female Country Vocal Performance — "I Don't Know Why You Don't Want Me", Rosanne CashBest Male Country Vocal Performance — "Lost in the Fifties Tonight", Ronnie MilsapBest Country Performance by a Duo or Group with Vocal — "Why Not Me" The JuddsBest Country Instrumental Performance — "Cosmic Square Dance", Chet Atkins and Mark KnopflerBest Country Song — "Highwayman," Jimmy Webb (Performer: The Highwaymen)

Juno AwardsCountry Male Vocalist of the Year — Murray McLauchlanCountry Female Vocalist of the Year — Anne MurrayCountry Group or Duo of the Year — Family Brown

Academy of Country MusicEntertainer of the Year — AlabamaSong of the Year — "Lost in the Fifties Tonight", Fred Parris, Mike Reid and Troy Seals (Performer: Ronnie Milsap)Single of the Year — "Highwayman", The HighwaymenAlbum of the Year — Does Fort Worth Ever Cross Your Mind, George StraitTop Male Vocalist — George StraitTop Female Vocalist — Reba McEntireTop Vocal Duo — The JuddsTop Vocal Group — AlabamaTop New Male Vocalist — Randy TravisTop New Female Vocalist — Judy RodmanVideo of the Year — "Who's Gonna Fill Their Shoes?", George Jones (Directors: Marc Ball)

Canadian Country Music AssociationEntertainer of the Year — Dick DamronMale Artist of the Year — Terry CarisseFemale Artist of the Year — Carroll BakerGroup of the Year — The Mercey BrothersSOCAN Song of the Year — "Counting the I Love You's", Terry Carisse, Bruce Rawlins (Performer: Terry Carisse)Single of the Year — "Riding on the Wind", Gary FjellgaardAlbum of the Year — Closest Thing to You, Terry CarisseTop Selling Album — Once Upon a Christmas, Dolly Parton & Kenny RogersVista Rising Star Award — Ginny MitchellDuo of the Year — Anita Perras and Tim Taylor

Country Music AssociationEntertainer of the Year — Ricky SkaggsSong of the Year — "God Bless the USA", Lee Greenwood (Performer: Lee Greenwood)Single of the Year — "Why Not Me", The JuddsAlbum of the Year — Does Fort Worth Ever Cross Your Mind, George StraitMale Vocalist of the Year — George StraitFemale Vocalist of the Year — Reba McEntireVocal Duo of the Year — Dave Loggins and Anne MurrayVocal Group of the Year — The JuddsHorizon Award — Sawyer BrownMusic Video of the Year — "All My Rowdy Friends Are Coming Over Tonight", Hank Williams Jr. (Director: John Goodhue)Instrumentalist of the Year — Chet AtkinsInstrumental Group of the Year''' — Ricky Skaggs Band

See also
Country Music Association
Inductees of the Country Music Hall of Fame

References

Further reading
Kingsbury, Paul, The Grand Ole Opry: History of Country Music. 70 Years of the Songs, the Stars and the Stories, Villard Books, Random House; Opryland USA, 1995
Kingsbury, Paul, Vinyl Hayride: Country Music Album Covers 1947–1989, Country Music Foundation, 2003
Millard, Bob, Country Music: 70 Years of America's Favorite Music, HarperCollins, New York, 1993
Whitburn, Joel, Top Country Songs 1944–2005'' – 6th Edition. 2005

External links
Country Music Hall of Fame

Country
Country music by year